"And the Beat Goes On" is a 1979 single by the American music group the Whispers. The song was their first of two number-one singles on the Soul chart, and their first Top 20 hit on the Billboard Hot 100, peaking at number 19. "And the Beat Goes On" was the group's only number-one song on the dance chart. It was also their first and biggest hit in the United Kingdom, peaking at number 2 on the UK Singles Chart. The song also peaked at number 27 on the Canadian RPM chart.

In 1996 after Phyllis Hyman died, the Whispers honored her with a musical: Thank God! The Beat Goes On. The fictionalized story intertwines the long-running career of the Whispers with the rise of Hyman, using songs by the Whispers including ones Hyman sang with them such as "The Beat Goes On." The Whispers played themselves while R&B singer Alyson Williams covered the role of Hyman.

Track listing
7" single
"And the Beat Goes On" – 3:25
"Can You Do the Boogie" – 3:50

12" single
"And the Beat Goes On" – 7:30
"Can You Do the Boogie" – 6:07

Charts

Weekly charts

Year-end charts

In popular culture
The song was sampled in Monie Love's 1989 single "I Can Do This" from her debut album Down to Earth and in Will Smith's 1998 single "Miami", from his 1997 album called Big Willie Style and is featured in the 2002 video game Grand Theft Auto: Vice City.

See also
List of number-one dance singles of 1980 (U.S.)
List of number-one R&B singles of 1980 (U.S.)

References

1979 songs
1979 singles
Post-disco songs
SOLAR Records singles
Songs written by Leon Sylvers III
The Whispers songs